Interstellar or Interstella may refer to:

Space
 Interstellar space
 Interstellar medium
 Interstellar travel
 Interstellar communication
 Interstellar probe
 Interstellar Probe (spacecraft) (ISP), a NASA probe proposed in 2018 for launch in the 2030s.
 Interstellar Express (IHP), Chinese probes proposed in 2019 for launch in 2024.

Art, entertainment, and media

Films and soundtracks
 Interstella 5555: The 5tory of the 5ecret 5tar 5ystem, an animated film set to Daft Punk's album Discovery
 Interstellar (film), a 2014 science fiction film directed by Christopher Nolan
 Interstellar (soundtrack), the soundtrack to the 2014 film Interstellar

Music

Groups
 Intastella, a band in the second wave of the Manchester music scene
 Interstellar (band), a Canadian rock band

Albums
 Interstellar Space, John Coltrane album
 Interstellar: The String Quartet Tribute to Interpol, an album by Vitamin String Quartet
 Interstellar, an album by Frankie Rose

Songs
 "Interstellar", a track from the album Folk by Ultramarine

Organizations
 Interstellar Technologies, Japanese company

See also
 Intergalactic (disambiguation)
 Interplanetary (disambiguation)